The women's singles was one of five events of the 1920 World Hard Court Championships tennis tournament held in Paris, France from 23 until 30 May 1920. The draw consisted of 15 players. Suzanne Lenglen was the defending champion, but did not participate. Dorothy Holman won the title, defeating Francisca Subirana in the final.

Draw

Draw

References 

Women's Singles
World Hard Court Championships